The Solomon Islands national futsal team, nicknamed Kurukuru, represents the Solomon Islands in international futsal competitions and is controlled by the Solomon Islands Football Federation. It is one of the strongest teams in Oceania, but fares poorly in competitions outside the region.

The team's coach in 2008 was Victor Wai’ia. By 2009, he had been succeeded by Dickson Kadau. The country has no futsal stadium, although in July 2009 Prime Minister Derek Sikua promised that the government would assist in building one.

On 6 October 2008, the Solomon Islands established a record for the worst defeat in the history of the FIFA Futsal World Cup in Brazil 2008, when they were beaten by Russia thirty-one goals to two. It was the country's first participation in the World Cup; it finished last in Group A, with four games lost out of four, 6 goals for and 69 against. At the 2012 FIFA Futsal World Cup in Thailand, the Kurukuru once again finished last in their group, suffering heavy defeats to Russia and Colombia, but did manage to obtain their first World Cup win, beating Guatemala 4–3.

On a regional level, however, the Kurukuru won the 2008 Oceanian Futsal Championship, and successfully defended their title in 2009, beating Fiji 8–1 in the final, and then again in 2010 and 2011. After failing to win in 2013 and not competing in 2014, they would win their record-tying fifth OFC Futsal Championship in 2016. They are, therefore, the current regional champions.

The Solomon Islands national futsal team currently holds the world record for the fastest ever goal scored in an official futsal match. It was set by Kurukuru captain Elliot Ragomo, who scored against New Caledonia three seconds into the game in July 2009.

Results and fixtures

The following is a list of match results in the last 12 months, as well as any future matches that have been scheduled.
Legend

2021

Team

Current squad
The following players were called up for the 2021 FIFA Futsal World Cup.

Competitive record

FIFA Futsal World Cup

OFC Futsal Nations Cup

Confederations Cup

References

External links
The Solomon Times’ coverage of team Kurukuru's performance at the 2008 FIFA Futsal World Cup

Solomon Islands
Futsal
Football in the Solomon Islands
Futsal in the Solomon Islands